Live on Stage may refer to:
Live on Stage (New Riders of the Purple Sage album), 1993
Live on Stage (Chuck Berry album), 2000
Live on Stage (Monsieur Camembert album), 2001